The New Brunswick Rugby Union (NBRU) is the provincial administrative body for rugby union in New Brunswick, Canada.

External links
 NBRU Site

Rugby
Rugby union governing bodies in Canada